Bobby DePaul (born 1963) is the former director of pro personnel for the Chicago Bears of the National Football League (NFL).

College
DePaul played linebacker at the University of Maryland.

Coaching / front-office career
DePaul started his coaching career with the Washington Redskins in 1989.  He coached with the Washington Redskins and Cincinnati Bengals for eight years before entering the Philadelphia Eagles front office.

He was the Director of Pro Player Personnel for the Chicago Bears from 2001-06-19 to 2010-02-15.

References

1963 births
Living people
Maryland Terrapins football players
Washington Redskins coaches
Cincinnati Bengals coaches
Chicago Bears executives